Aleksandar Tenekedžiev (born 13 March 1986 in Valandovo) is a Macedonian footballer, who most recently played for FC Grenchen.

Club careеr
He left in January 2010 his club FK Turnovo and signed for FK Metalurg Skopje.

Notes

External links

1986 births
Living people
People from Valandovo
Association football midfielders
Macedonian footballers
PFC Slavia Sofia players
KF Shkëndija players
FK Horizont Turnovo players
FK Metalurg Skopje players
FC Grenchen players
First Professional Football League (Bulgaria) players
Macedonian First Football League players
Macedonian expatriate footballers
Expatriate footballers in Bulgaria
Macedonian expatriate sportspeople in Bulgaria
Expatriate footballers in Switzerland
Macedonian expatriate sportspeople in Switzerland